The Pontefract & Castleford Express is a local newspaper covering the towns of Pontefract and Castleford in Wakefield District, West Yorkshire, northern England.

The newspaper is published by Johnston Publishing Ltd. It is based in Front Street, Pontefract.
The newspaper has a social media presence.
The newspaper's content is summarised in the Wakefield Express.

References

External links
 Pontefract & Castleford Express website

Year of establishment missing
Newspapers published in Yorkshire
Weekly newspapers published in the United Kingdom
Pontefract
Castleford